William H. Ziegler (September 4, 1909 in Allegheny County, Pennsylvania – July 2, 1977 in Encino, California) was an American film editor. He edited over 100 films during his long career, most notably The Music Man, My Fair Lady and Strangers on a Train. He also edited several of the Our Gang shorts.

Oscar nominations
All three nominations were in the category of Best Film Editing

31st Academy Awards-Nominated for Auntie Mame. Lost to Gigi.
35th Academy Awards-Nominated for The Music Man. Lost to Lawrence of Arabia.
37th Academy Awards-Nominated for My Fair Lady. Lost to Mary Poppins.

References

External links

American film editors
Artists from Philadelphia
1909 births
1977 deaths
Warner Bros. people